João Manuel de Oliveira Pinto (born 3 August 1971) is a Portuguese retired footballer who played as an attacking midfielder.

External links

1971 births
Living people
Footballers from Lisbon
Portuguese footballers
Association football midfielders
Primeira Liga players
Liga Portugal 2 players
Segunda Divisão players
Sporting CP footballers
Atlético Clube de Portugal players
Vitória S.C. players
G.D. Estoril Praia players
Gil Vicente F.C. players
S.C. Braga players
S.C. Farense players
C.S. Marítimo players
Associação Académica de Coimbra – O.A.F. players
Imortal D.C. players
Amora F.C. players
G.D. Sesimbra footballers
Portugal youth international footballers
Portugal under-21 international footballers